Thulatthana was an early monarch of the Kingdom of Anuradhapura, based at the ancient capital of Anuradhapura that ruled in the year 119 BC. Thulatthana was the son of Saddha Tissa and the brother of Lanja Tissa, Khallata Naga and Valagamba.

See also
 List of Sri Lankan monarchs

External links 
 Kings & Rulers of Sri Lanka
 Codrington's Short History of Ceylon

Monarchs of Anuradhapura
T
 Sinhalese Buddhist monarchs
T
T